Prashant Kumar (born 26 September 1992) is an Indian cricketer. He made his first-class debut on 17 December 2019, for Haryana in the 2019–20 Ranji Trophy.

References

External links
 

1992 births
Living people
Indian cricketers
Haryana cricketers
Place of birth missing (living people)